Oil megaprojects are large oil field projects.

Summary of megaprojects
Definition of megaproject: 20,000 barrels per day (3,200 m3/d) of new liquid fuel capacity.

Megaprojects predicted for individual years

Application to oil supply forecasting

A series of project tabulations and analyses by Chris Skrebowski, editor of Petroleum Review, have presented a more pessimistic picture of future oil supply. By 2006, although "the outlook for future supply appears somewhat brighter than even six months ago", nonetheless, if "all the factors reducing new capacity come into play, markets will remain tight and prices high. Only if new capacity flows into the system rather more rapidly than of late, will there be any chance of rebuilding spare capacity and softening prices."

The smallest fields, even in aggregate, do not contribute a large fraction of the total.  For example, a relatively small number of giant and super-giant oilfields are providing almost half of the world production.

Decline rates

The most important variable is the average decline rate for Fields in Production (FIP) which is difficult to assess.

See also

Energy law
List of largest oil fields
Giant oil and gas fields
List of Russian megaprojects

References

Further reading

 
Oil fields